Abazu may refer to:

 Abazu, Myanmar, a village in the Bago Division of Myanmar
 Abazu (Assyrian king) (  - )
 Abazu-Akabo, an autonomous community in Ikeduru Local Government Area of Imo State, Nigeria

See also